Janomima is a genus of moths in the family Eupterotidae.

Species
 Janomima dannfelti Aurivillius, 1893
 Janomima ibandana Dall'Asta, 1979
 Janomima mariana White, 1843

Former species
 Janomima karschi Weyman., 1903
 Janomima mesundulata Strand, 1911
 Janomima westwoodi Aurivillius, 1901

References

Eupterotinae
Moth genera